Patricia Pasquali (1961–2008) was an Argentine historian and writer.

Works
In addition to numerous articles in scientific journals in the area of its competence and others, published eleven books, her first book was San Martin in ostracism (Prize "Argentina" of the National Academy of History).
The teaching of history in Argentina (2005), ZULETA ALVAREZ, E., FERNÁNDEZ LATOUR boots, O., MAY, C., Patricia PASQUALI San Martin (2004)
The liberal establishment. Urquiza, Mitre and statesman forgotten: Nicasio Orono (2003)
San Martín. The man and his mission. Versions of a story (2002)
The teaching of history in Argentina (2000), ZULETA ALVAREZ, E., FERNÁNDEZ LATOUR boots, O., MAY, C., Patricia PASQUALI
San Martín confidential. Liberator's personal correspondence with his friend Tomás Guido (1816–1849) (2000)
Bernardino Rivadavia. Man of Buenos Aires, city argentino.1 ed. Buenos Aires: Planet (1999) Segreti, CSA, Patricia PASQUALI San Martín. 
The strength of the mission and the loneliness of Glory (1999)
J. Daniel Infante (1996)
Juan Lavalle. A warrior in times of revolution and dictatorship (1996)
San Martín in ostracism: prophecy, silence and Glory (1992)

Death
Patricia Pasquali died at age 47. Her remains are in Rosario.

1961 births
2008 deaths
20th-century Argentine historians
20th-century Argentine women writers
20th-century Argentine writers
Argentine women historians
21st-century Argentine historians